Something Beautiful for God is a 1971 book by Malcolm Muggeridge on Mother Teresa. The book was based on a 1969 BBC documentary on Mother Teresa (also entitled Something Beautiful for God) that Muggeridge had undertaken.

In his book Muggeridge was a former left-wing radical. He became disillusioned with communism when he was the Moscow correspondent for the Guardian newspaper. He ended up joining Gareth Jones of the Times of London as the only two Western journalists to expose Stalin's Forced famine in Ukraine. The Soviets killed four million people in the  Holodomor genocide. When the former communist and continuing agnostic researched the work of Mother Teresa's order of nuns in Calcutta's House of the Dying, he experienced a religious conversion which eventually led him to enter the Catholic Church in 1982.

The book was first published by HarperCollins.

Criticism
In his book The Missionary Position: Mother Teresa in Theory and Practice and also in a 1994 documentary entitled Hell's Angel the journalist Christopher Hitchens derided Muggeridge as "that old fraud and mountebank".  Hitchens dismissed as risible the account of a "divine light" miracle which Muggeridge claimed to have witnessed in Calcutta's House of the Dying. On viewing footage of the film Something Beautiful for God, Muggeridge attributed the clarity of the images to Teresa's "divine light".  Although the more prosaic and realistic explanation was that the BBC cameraman had loaded a new faster film for some poorly lit indoor shots, Muggeridge promoted this "heavenly aura event" as a miracle narrative to the media. Hitchens considers that Muggeridge's subjective interpretation of the events he witnessed in Calcutta and the consequent publicity surrounding those events contributed to Mother Teresa's seraphic reputation.

References

1971 non-fiction books
Mother Teresa
Indian biographies
Indian non-fiction books